Argyrotaenia haemothicta is a species of moth of the family Tortricidae. It is found in Colombia and Napo Province of Ecuador.

The ground colour of the forewings is whitish, suffused with cinnamon and grey and with brown markings. The hindwings are whitish, suffused with brown on the periphery.

References

Moths described in 1926
haemothicta
Moths of South America